Beryllophantis is a genus of moths belonging to the subfamily Tortricinae of the family Tortricidae.

Species
Beryllophantis allochlora Horak & Sauter, 1979
Beryllophantis alphophora Horak & Sauter, 1979
Beryllophantis asticta Horak & Sauter, 1979
Beryllophantis cochlias Meyrick, 1938
Beryllophantis microtera Horak & Sauter, 1979
Beryllophantis phaioptera Horak & Sauter, 1979
Beryllophantis poicila Horak & Sauter, 1979

See also
List of Tortricidae genera

References

 , 2005: World Catalogue of Insects vol. 5 Tortricidae.
 , 1979: Revision of the genus Beryllophantis Meyrick (Lepidoptera : Tortricidae). Australian Journal of Zoology 27 (5): 789–811. 
 , 1938, Trans. R. Soc. Lond. 87: 509

External links
tortricidae.com

Tortricini
Tortricidae genera
Taxa named by Edward Meyrick